Francine Beers (November 26, 1924 – March 27, 2014) was an American radio, television, film and theatre actress. Her career spanned nearly six decades.

Life and career
Beers was born in Brooklyn, New York, the only child of Harry and Sadie Beers. Her father had two sisters, Rose and Sally. Sally appeared in vaudeville and in the Ziegfeld Follies. Harry Beers died when Francine was 15 years old. Francine and her mother moved in with Sadie's parents until Francine graduated from Abraham Lincoln High School in 1942.

After graduation, she worked for Young & Rubicam advertising, beginning in 1944 in their Radio and Television department. In 1964, she left Young and Rubicam to become an actress. She largely played character parts and supporting roles in radio, on stage, in soap operas and on television shows. Her roles included Judge Janis Silver (Law and Order), Sybil Gooley (All in the Family; a role also played by Jane Connell), and Bea Finster on Kate & Allie. Before and after venturing into TV acting, she enjoyed a lengthy theatre career in the 1960s and 1970s, appearing in such plays as "Cafe Crown" (1964), 6 Rms Riv Vu (1972; she also appeared in the 1974 TV film adaptation), Arthur Miller's The American Clock ("A Mural for Theatre") (1980), and William Alfred's The Curse of an Aching Heart in 1982.

Beers continued to work as an actress until she retired in 2007. Her last noted role was as Mrs. Lefkowitz in In Her Shoes (2004).

Death
Beers died on Thursday, March 27, 2014, aged 89, in her apartment on Manhattan's Upper West Side.

Career

Theatrical roles
 1962: King of the Whole Damn World, Jan Hus Playhouse, NY (Hannah Klein)
 1964: Café Crown (Celia Perlman)
 1964, 1965: Kiss Mama (Susie)
 1966: Monopoly at the Establishment Theatre, NY (The Mother)
 1967: Funny Girl (Mrs. Strakosh, the matchmaker)
 1972–1973: Six Rooms Riv Vu (Lady in 4A and Trixie's mother)
 1980–81: The American Clock (Fanny Margulies)
 1982: Curse of an Aching Heart in Little Theatre New York (Minnie Crump)
 1982: New Theatre Workshop Monday Evening Series, BMI Workshop appearances

Major theatrical tours
 1966: Midnight Ride of Alvin Blum (Clara)
 1967: On a Clear Day, etc. (Mrs. Hatch)

Film
 1971: Made for Each Other
 1971: A New Leaf - Henrietta's Servant
 1984: Over the Brooklyn Bridge - Ruth Sherman
 1987: 3 Men and a Baby - Woman at Gift Shop
 1988: Sticky Fingers - Gertie
 1998: Meschugge - Martha Galinski
 2000: Keeping the Faith - Greta Nussbaum
 2005: Trust the Man - Old Lady
 2005: In Her Shoes - Mrs. Lefkowitz
 2007: Lucky You - Elderly Female Player

Television
 1970: The Doctors - Patient
 1974: The Carol Burnett Show - Mrs. Raskin
 1974: 6 Rms Riv Vu - Woman in 4 A
 1975: All in the Family - Sybil Gooley
 1980: Alone at Last - Agnes Bernowski
 1978–81: Edge of Night - Lillian Goodman #1
 1981: ABC Afterschool Specials - Mrs. Kvares
 1981–82: One of the Boys - Mrs. Green
 1985: Brass - Eileen
 1986: Kate & Allie - Bea Finster
 1989: Chicken Soup - Hilda
 1989: True Blue
 1990: The Days and Nights of Molly Dodd - Receptionist
 1991: American Playhouse - Judy
 1991–97: Law & Order - Arraignment Judge Janis Silver
 1993: TriBeCa - Woman in Curlers
 1995: The Wright Verdicts - Judge Simpson
 2000: Law & Order: Special Victims Unit - Francis Reiner
 2002: Sex and the City - Mrs. Cohen

Awards
1988: Helen Hayes Award, Washington D.C. Light Up the Sky - Arena Stage Outstanding Supporting Actress in a Resident Production.

Links
 King of the Whole Damn World - O'Connor, Jim (April 16, 1962). "'King of the World' A Very Funny Show". New York Times.
 King of the Whole Damn World - Dallas, Athena (April 27, 1962). "Hellenic American Scenes". The Greek Press, Chicago Illinois.
 King of the Whole Damn World - 'JH" (April 28, 1962). "King of the Whole Damn World". Cue.
 King of the Whole Damn World - "The Imps of Bleeker Street". Saturday Review. May 6, 1962.
 Kiss Mama - Molleson, John (October 2, 1964). "'Kiss Mama': Twirling A Flavorful Pasta". New York Herald Tribune.
 Kiss Mama - Thompson, Jack (October 2, 1964). "La Rosa Turns to Acting". American.
 Kiss Mama - Davis, James (October 2, 1964). "'Mama' Is A Fun Play". Daily News.
 Kiss Mama - Funk, Lewis (October 2, 1964). "George Panetta's 'Kiss Mama' at the Actors Playhouse". New York Times.
 Kiss Mama - Lloyd, Eric (October 5, 1964). "A Family Saga". Wall Street Journal.
 Kiss Mama - Share, Peter (October 8, 1964). "Theatre: 'Kiss Mama'". Village Voice.
 Kiss Mama - "Off Broadway: At Home with the Caparutas". New Yorker. October 10, 1964.
 Kiss Mama - 'Kenn.' (October 21, 1964). "Off-Broadway Reviews: Kiss Mama". Variety.
 Monopoly - Molleson, John (March 7, 1966). "4 Short Plays by Jerome Kass Mark Birth of a Playwright". New York Herald Tribune.
 Funny Girl - Kelly, Herb (March 15, 1967). "'Funny Girl' A Hit Show That Uncovers New Star". The Miami News.
 Funny Girl - Burns, Ben (April 4, 1967). "Barb(Actress)ra Funny 'Funny Girl'". Miami Herald.
 Funny Girl - Freund Bob (April 4, 1967). "'Funny Girl' Tugs At The Heart, Tickles Ribs". Ft. Lauderdale News.
 Clear Day - Dettmer, Roger (August 4, 1967). "Two Cheers for 'Clear Day'". Chicago's American.

References

1924 births
2014 deaths
Jewish American actresses
Abraham Lincoln High School (Brooklyn) alumni
American film actresses
American radio actresses
American stage actresses
American television actresses
Actresses from New York City
People from the Upper West Side
20th-century American actresses
21st-century American actresses
21st-century American Jews